Phumzile Matyhila (born 2 September 1975) is a South African former boxer. He competed in the men's light flyweight event at the 2000 Summer Olympics.

References

External links
 

1975 births
Living people
South African male boxers
Olympic boxers of South Africa
Boxers at the 2000 Summer Olympics
Boxers at the 1998 Commonwealth Games
Commonwealth Games bronze medallists for South Africa
Commonwealth Games medallists in boxing
People from Mdantsane
African Games medalists in boxing
Light-flyweight boxers
Sportspeople from the Eastern Cape
African Games silver medalists for South Africa
Competitors at the 1999 All-Africa Games
Medallists at the 1998 Commonwealth Games